Jamie Brewer is an American actress and model. She is best known for her roles in the FX horror anthology television series American Horror Story. In its first season, Murder House, she portrayed Adelaide "Addie" Langdon; in the third season, Coven, she portrayed Nan, an enigmatic and clairvoyant witch; in the fourth season Freak Show, she portrayed Chester Creb's vision of his doll, Marjorie; in the seventh season Cult, she portrayed Hedda, a member of the 'SCUM' crew, led by feminist Valerie Solanas; and she also returned to her role as Nan in the eighth season, Apocalypse.

Life and career
Brewer grew up loving all forms of the arts, especially movies and theater productions. She started by taking theater classes in 1999 at a College for Kids class during her middle school years. She performed in dramas, musicals, comedies, and many improvisations during her theater training at Dionysus Theater. Brewer appeared and spoke in PSAs for the Super Bowl of Caring Houston Food Drive in Houston, Texas for two consecutive years which aired on NBC, ABC, and CBS. Brewer continues her stage training through The Groundlings Theater and School.

In 2011, Brewer made her television debut as Adelaide "Addie" Langdon in American Horror Story: Murder House.  "I first got word of the audition for the show from a friend of mine." She said. "They were looking for a young lady with Down syndrome who could act.  My headshot and resume were submitted and I was called for an audition and, to my surprise I got the part. I was so excited."
About her role, Brewer stated: "Adelaide is a complex character, but the most difficult part of playing Adelaide is learning how to portray someone who isn't always viewed acceptable to her mother and society. This is a new challenge for me."

After the show's first season ended, she appeared on Southland in an episode titled "Heat", which aired on February 20, 2013. Also in 2013, she returned to American Horror Story for the third season, subtitled Coven, playing the supporting role of Nan, a young witch who is clairvoyant.

It was announced at the 2014 PaleyFest that Brewer would return to the series for the fourth season, subtitled American Horror Story: Freak Show. Although, at a later date, show creator Ryan Murphy indicated Brewer may not appear during the season. Brewer was later confirmed after appearing in a promo for the final two episodes. She both voiced and played Marjorie,  the ventriloquist's dummy of another character.

In February 2015, Brewer became the first woman with Down syndrome to walk the red carpet at New York Fashion Week, which she did for designer Carrie Hammer.
Talking about the experience, Brewer said, "It's amazing that the fashion industry are including individuals with disabilities," she said. "It's an amazing opportunity for women, women that are disabled." Another time she also said, "Young girls and even young women [see me] and say 'hey, if she can do it so can I'. It's a true inspiration being a role model for any young women to [encourage them] in being who they are and showing who they are." 

In July 2015, she appeared as a character named Jamie in three episodes of the web series Raymond & Lane, while In September, Brewer appeared on Switched at Birth in an episode titled "Between hope and fear". The next month she claimed her title as a recipient of the Quincy Jones Exceptional Advocacy Award by the Global Down Syndrome Foundation.
The same month, during an interview, Brewer was asked if she would make an appearance in American Horror Story’s upcoming fifth season, subtitled Hotel. She responded with; "Possibly. I don't fully know, it depends. I really want to be." However, she did not appear in the season.

In May 2017, Brewer starred in the comedy short Whitney's Wedding, in which she played a bride who gets 'cold-feet' when she starts thinking her fiancé is not "normal".
In October, American singer Miley Cyrus asked Brewer to introduce her at the Variety Power of Women event, where Cyrus received an award for The Happy Hippie Foundation. Cyrus’ non-profit foundation focuses on youth homelessness (particularly among LGBTQ youth), the LGBTQ community, and other vulnerable populations.
"We’ve never met in person before today, but I'm a huge fan of Jamie's,” Cyrus said during her acceptance speech. “I thought she would beautifully encompass the Happy Hippie Foundation and all we represent.” Brewer also returned to American Horror Story on its seventh season Cult. In the seventh episode of the season she portrayed Hedda, a member of the original 'SCUM' crew, led by feminist Valerie Solanas. Around the same time, Brewer had a role in Bridget Everett’s Love You More, a pilot filmed for Amazon Video that was later not picked up.

In February 2018, Brewer made her off-Broadway debut in Amy and the Orphans, a play by Lindsey Ferrentino about three siblings, one of whom has Down Syndrome, in the wake of their father's death.
She was the first woman with Down syndrome to star in an Off-Broadway play. In April, Brewer was nominated for an Outstanding Featured Actress in a Play by the Outer Critics Circle Awards for her performance in Amy and the Orphans. In June of the same year, she won the Drama Desk Award for Outstanding Featured Actress in a Play for her performance. Soon afterwards, she was cast, as Gina, in the independent drama film Turnover.

During October, Brewer briefly appeared on American Horror Story once again, on its eighth season subtitled Apocalypse, where she reprised the role she played in Coven. Brewer's return as Nan received positive reviews from hardcore fans. Katie Louise-Smith from PopBuzz called Brewer "brilliant" and stated the return was "short but sweet". Ron Hogan of Den of Geek reacted to Brewer's return positively, noting her return was "handled well". However, Kat Rosenfield from Entertainment Weekly criticized the scene featuring Nan, commenting that it "serves mostly as fan service". Brewer also briefly appeared in the tenth and final episode of the season.

Filmography

Film

Television

Theater

Web

References

External links

Actors with Down syndrome
American film actresses
American television actresses
21st-century American actresses
Actresses from California
American stage actresses
Living people
Models with disabilities
Female models from California
Drama Desk Award winners
Theatre World Award winners
Place of birth missing (living people)
Year of birth missing (living people)